This is the complete list of Asian Games medalists in equestrian from 1982 to 2018.

Events

Individual dressage

Team dressage

Individual endurance

Team endurance

Individual eventing

Team eventing

Individual jumping

Team jumping

Individual tent pegging

References 

Asian Games results at FEI

External links
 Olympic Council of Asia
 2018 medalists

Equestrian
medalists